Finishing school is a type of private school for girls that emphasizes cultural studies and prepares its students especially for social activities.

Finishing school may also refer to:

Films
Finishing School (1934 film), American romantic drama directed by George Nichols, Jr.
Finishing School (1953 film), Italian romantic comedy directed by Bernard Vorhaus; also known as Luxury Girls; original title Fanciulle di lusso
The Finishing School (film), 1969 Spanish horror feature directed by Narciso Ibáñez Serrador

Literature
The Finishing School (Spark novel), 2004 novella by Scottish writer Muriel Spark
The Finishing School, 1984 novel by American writer Gail Godwin
The Finishing School, 2005 book by American writer Dick Couch
Finishing School (series), a four-book young adult steampunk series by American writer Gail Carriger

Music 
The Finishing School, a band/project by musician Sasha Bell of Essex Green and The Ladybug Transistor

Other
Finishing school (India), supplementary training school